Carnegie Center -- Port Huron Museum is the main building in the Port Huron, Michigan museum system.  The building was financed by a $40,000.00 donation from Pittsburgh philanthropist and steel entrepreneur Andrew Carnegie.

It opened as the Port Huron Public Library on May 26, 1904.  The keynote address was delivered by Melvil Dewey, State Librarian of New York, and creator of the Dewey Decimal System.

In 1967, the Port Huron Public Library was moved and reconstituted as the St. Clair County, Michigan Library System.  The new and larger structure is located at 210 McMorran Boulevard.

Thereafter, the original building became the cornerstone of the museum.

The Port Huron Museum is a series of four elements, namely:
 Carnegie Center -- Port Huron Museum
 Huron Lightship
 Thomas Edison Depot Museum
 Fort Gratiot Lighthouse

Notes

External links
Port Huron Museum website

Carnegie libraries in Michigan
Port Huron, Michigan
History museums in Michigan
Museums in St. Clair County, Michigan
Libraries established in 1904
1904 establishments in Michigan
Museums established in 1967
1967 establishments in Michigan
Beaux-Arts architecture in Michigan
Neoclassical architecture in Michigan